The .270 Winchester is a rifle cartridge developed by Winchester Repeating Arms Company in 1923 and unveiled in 1925 as a chambering for their bolt-action Model 54 to become arguably the flattest shooting cartridge of its day, only competing with the .300 Holland & Holland Magnum, also introduced in the same year.  

As the .280 Remington, and the .30-06 Springfield, the .270 Winchester derived from the .30-03 parent case and the bore diameter was likely inspired by 7mm Mauser. The .270 Winchester uses a .270 inch (6.86 mm) bore diameter and a .277 inch (7.04 mm) bullet diameter.

History
Introduced in 1925 along with the Winchester Model 54 bolt action rifle under the name "270 WCF" (270 Winchester Centerfire), the .270 Winchester was not an immediate success due to the popularity of the relatively recently introduced .30-06 Springfield, chambered for the M1903 Springfield bolt action rifle, which was commonly "sporterized" for hunting purposes.

However, the .270 Winchester attained great popularity among hunters and sporting rifle enthusiasts in the succeeding decades and especially in the post-World War II period, ranking it among the most popular and widely used big game hunting cartridges worldwide, especially with the widespread popularity of rifle scopes. Shooters started noticing that the .277" caliber cartridge was capable of shooting flatter than the popular 30–06.

The .270 Winchester, conceived solely as a big game hunting cartridge, became very popular, in part, due to the widespread praises of gun writer Jack O'Connor who used the cartridge for 40 years and touted its merits in the pages of Outdoor Life as well as other renowned gun writers of the time such as late Col. Townsend Whelen.

Two additional bullet weights were soon introduced: a 100-grain (6.5 gram) hollow-point bullet for varmint shooting, and a 150 grain (9.7 gram) bullet, offering a higher sectional density, which made it suitable for achieving better penetration for large sized deer, such as wapiti, and moose. However, the 130 grain bullet remains the most popular option.

For decades the only other commercial 6.8mm cartridge available for sporting purposes was the .270 Weatherby Magnum, which offered a flatter trajectory based on the larger powder capacity allowed by the belted magnum case, however due to the higher price and offer limit, it never reached the popularity of the .270 Winchester.

Nowadays a new breed of .277" caliber cartridges have been introduced to the market, including the .270 Winchester Short Magnum, which launches a bullet of the same weight 200 fps faster from a short action mechanism; the 27 Nosler, which is even faster but requires a long magnum action, and the recent 6.8 Western, which is basically a modification of the 270 WSM firing a heavier and larger bullet with a higher ballistic coefficient. Nevertheless, none of these new cartridges match the popularity of the old 270 Winchester and offer little advantage for practical hunting purposes.

Other of the main reasons why the .270 Win is still one of the most popular loads is because of its acceptance worldwide. Internationally, ammunition and  firearms manufacturers offer this chambering in a wide range of firearm options including bolt-actions, single-shots, lever-actions (such as the Browning BLR), pump-actions (such as the Remington 7600), autoloaders (such as the Remington 7400), and even a few double rifles.

Sporting use
The .270 Winchester is a suitable cartridge for hunting deer-sized game at open ranges making it suitable for plains game and mountain hunting. It may be chambered in standard length actions and though the optimum barrel size is considered to be 24 inches, it doesn't lose much muzzle velocity with 22 inch barrels, making it a suitable cartridge for developing a light mountain rifle.

Loaded with a 130-grain bullet with a muzzle velocity of about 3,060 fps. and sighted to touch 3 inches above line of sight at 100 yards (90 meters), the .270 Winchester will not rise more than 3.5 inches, to touch the line of sight at approximately 270 yards, providing a maximum point blank range of about 325 yards for a 7-inch diameter target, matching the vital area of deer sized game, allowing the hunter to shoot within that distance without having to think about compensating the bullet drop. The cartridge loaded with the 130-grain bullet will also retain 1,500 ft-lb. of energy up to 400 yards, which is considered the minimum suitable for elk.

Performance 

Cartridges are commonly available from  sizes with  loads being by far the most popular. Though handloaders have a wider range of options with the availability of bullets in a number of weights from 90 to 180 grains (5.8 to 11.7 grams), rifles are barrelled with 1:10 inch twist rifling, which may stabilize bullets up to 150 gr in order to provide the required accuracy expected. Common bullet weight recommendations for shooting different game are as follows:
 bullets: varmint and small deer
 bullets: deer size game including mule deer, white tail, sheep, mountain goats, antelope 
 bullets: deer, red stag, elk, moose, caribou, and similar larger animals.

However, bullet construction shall be more important than bullet weight in order to shoot the heavier game.

Recent introductions of low-drag bullets suited to the .270 Winchester such as the Nosler Accubond Long-Range, Hornady ELD-X and Matrix long-range bullets are promoting renewed interest in the cartridge among long-range hunters.

However, "The slight difference in length of reformed cases doesn't make any practical difference."

See also
List of rifle cartridges
Table of handgun and rifle cartridges
7 mm caliber
.270 Winchester Short Magnum
 6.8 Western
6.8mm Remington SPC
.277 Wolverine
sectional density

References

 C.I.P. TDCC 270 Win.

 
Pistol and rifle cartridges
Winchester Repeating Arms Company cartridges